The 2023 FIS Freestyle Ski and Snowboarding World Championships are held in Bakuriani, Georgia from 19 February to 4 March 2023. This marks the first ever snow sports World Championships to be contested in Georgia.

A total of 30 medal events are on the program, with 16 being contested in the freestyle and freeski disciplines and 14 in snowboarding.

Host selection
In April 2017, the Georgian Ski Federation officially submitted a bid to host the event. In May 2018 at the annual FIS congress in Greece, Bakuriani was selected unanimously as the official host city for the event. Bakuriani was the only candidate to host the event.

Schedule
30 events are held.

Medal summary

Medal table

Freestyle skiing

Men

Women

Mixed

Snowboarding

Men

Women

Mixed

See also
2022–23 FIS Freestyle Ski World Cup
2022–23 FIS Snowboard World Cup

References

 
2023
2023 in freestyle skiing
2023
2023 in snowboarding
2023 in Georgian sport
Winter sports competitions in Georgia (country)
February 2023 sports events in Europe
March 2023 sports events in Europe
International sports competitions hosted by Georgia (country)